Lələli (also, Lelyali, Lyalyali, and Lyalyalo) is a village and municipality in the Qakh Rayon of Azerbaijan.  It has a population of 474.

References 

Populated places in Qakh District